Sergei Stepanovich Bodak (born 9 April 1964) is a former Russian professional footballer.

Club career
He made his professional debut in the Soviet Second League in 1982 for FC Dynamo Kashira.

On 5 July 1993, he committed a foul on Yuri Tishkov in a Russian Cup game which caused a horrific injury to Tishkov (Tishkov never fully recovered). Bodak was banned from football for life, but the ban was lifted a year later.

Honours
 Soviet Top League bronze: 1988.
 Soviet Cup finalist: 1988, 1989, 1990.
 Russian Premier League runner-up: 1992.

References

1964 births
Footballers from Moscow
Living people
Soviet footballers
Russian footballers
FC Torpedo Moscow players
FC Lokomotiv Moscow players
PFC Krylia Sovetov Samara players
FC Spartak Vladikavkaz players
FC Saturn Ramenskoye players
Russian Premier League players
Soviet Top League players
Association football defenders
FC Dynamo Moscow reserves players
FC Znamya Truda Orekhovo-Zuyevo players